Rostrum may refer to:

 Any kind of a platform for a speaker:
dais
pulpit
podium
 Rostrum (anatomy), a beak, or anatomical structure resembling a beak, as in the mouthparts of many sucking insects
 Rostrum (ship), a form of bow on naval ships
 Rostrum Records, an American record label
 The Rostrum, the official monthly magazine of the National Forensic League
Australian Rostrum, public speaking clubs

See also
 Rastrum, a musical writing implement used to draw staff lines
 Rostra, a large platform built in the ancient city of Rome
 Rostral (disambiguation)